Brajeshwar Prasad (22 October 1911 – 1979) was an Indian politician. He was elected to the Lok Sabha, the lower house of the Parliament of India from  Gaya in Bihar as a member of the  Indian National Congress.

References

External links
Official biographical sketch in Parliament of India website

1911 births
Year of death missing
India MPs 1952–1957
India MPs 1957–1962
India MPs 1962–1967
Indian National Congress politicians